Tradesman is a skilled worker in a particular field.

Tradesperson may also refer to:

 One who trades; a shopkeeper.
 Door-to-door salesman or saleswoman, a person who travels to customers' houses to sell them things
 Salesman or salesperson, a person who works in sales, such as to sell goods in a store
 Delivery person, a person who works in delivery, to transport goods to a customer's home
 ST Tradesman, a British tugboat